Moitessieria is a genus of minute freshwater snails with an operculum, aquatic gastropod molluscs or micromolluscs in the family Moitessieriidae.

Moitessieria is the type genus of the family Moitessieriidae.

Species
Species within the genus Moitessieria include:
 
 Moitessieria audiberti Girardi, 2015
 Moitessieria aurea Tarruella, Corbella, Prats, Guillén & Alba, 2012
 Moitessieria barrinae Alba, Corbella, Prats, Tarruella & Guillén, 2007
 Moitessieria bodoni Girardi, 2009
 Moitessieria boetersi Girardi, 2015
 Moitessieria bourguignati Coutagne, 1883
 Moitessieria calloti Girardi, 2004
 Moitessieria canfalonensis Corbella, Bros, Guillen, Prats & Cadevall, 2020
 Moitessieria collellensis Corbella, Alba, Tarruella, Prats & Guillén, 2006
 Moitessieria dexteri Corbella, Guillén, Prats, Tarruella & Alba, 2012
 Moitessieria fontsaintei Bertrand, 2001
 Moitessieria foui Boeters, 2003
 Moitessieria garrotxaensis Quiñonero-Salgado & Rolán, 2017
 Moitessieria guadelopensis Boeters, 2003
 Moitessieria guilhemensis Callot-Girardi & Boeters, 2017
 Moitessieria hedraensis Quiñonero-Salgado & Rolán, 2017
 Moitessieria heideae Boeters & Falkner, 2003
 Moitessieria juvenisanguis Boeters & E. Gittenberger, 1980
 Moitessieria lineolata (Coutagne, 1882) 
 Moitessieria lludrigaensis Boeters, 2003
 Moitessieria locardi Coutagne, 1883
 Moitessieria magnanae Girardi, 2009
 Moitessieria massoti Bourguignat, 1863
 Moitessieria meijersae Boeters, 2003
 Moitessieria mugae Corbella, Alba, Tarruella, Prats & Guillén, 2006
 Moitessieria nezi Boeters & Bertrand, 2001
 Moitessieria notenboomi Boeters, 2003
 Moitessieria olleri Altimira, 1960
 Moitessieria ouvezensis Boeters & Falkner, 2009
 Moitessieria pasterae Corbella, Alba, Tarruella, Guillén & Prats, 2009
 Moitessieria pesanta Quiñonero-Salgado & Rolán, 2019
 Moitessieria prioratensis Corbella, Alba, Tarruella, Guillén & Prats, 2009
 Moitessieria punctata Alba, Tarruella, Prats, Guillén & Corbella, 2010
 Moitessieria racamondi Callot-Girardi, 2013
 Moitessieria rhodani Coutagne, 1883
 Moitessieria ripacurtiae Tarruella, Corbella, Guillén, Prats & Alba, 2013
 Moitessieria robresia Boeters, 2003
 Moitessieria rolandiana Bourguignat, 1863
 Moitessieria sanctichristophori Corbella, Guillén, Prats, Tarruella & Alba, 2011
 Moitessieria seminiana Boeters, 2003
 Moitessieria servaini (Bourguignat, 1880)
 Moitessieria simoniana (Saint-Simon, 1848)
 Moitessieria tatirocae Tarruella, Corbella, Prats, Guillén & Alba, 2015

Species brought into synonymy
 Moitessieria corsica'Bernasconi, 1994: synonym of Corseria corsica (Bernasconi, 1994)
 Moitessieria lescherae Boeters, 1981: synonym of Sorholia lescherae (Boeters, 1981)
 Moitessieria rayi (Locard, 1882): synonym of Spiralix rayi (Locard, 1882)
 Moitessieria wienini Girardi, 2001: synonym of Henrigirardia wienini (Girardi, 2001)

References

(1ère parie). Résultats d'investigation des milieux karstiques, phréatiques et cavernicoles du Sud-Ouest. (Mollusca: Caenogastropoda: Moitessieridae; Hydrobiidae: Islamiinae: Amnicolidae). Avenionia 1: 30-43

External links
  Bourguignat J.R. (1863) Monographie du nouveau genre français Moitessieria. Revue et Magasin de Zoologie, ser. 2, 15(11): 432–445, pls 20–21.

Moitessieriidae